Eduardo Góes Neves is professor of archaeology at the University of São Paulo, Brazil. He is known for his work directing the Central Amazon Project from 1995 to 2010.

Career
Neves received his PhD from Indiana University.

In 2005, his colleague, American archaeologist James Petersen, died after he was shot when the pair were robbed at a restaurant in the Brazilian Amazon.

He was Capes visiting professor for 2016-17 at the David Rockefeller Center for Latin American Studies at Harvard University. He was president of the Brazilian Archaeological Society.

Selected publications

Books
 Arqueologia da Amazônia. Rio de Janeiro: Jorge Zahar, 2006
 Unknown Amazon: Culture in Nature in Ancient Brazil. British Museum Press, London, 2001. (Joint editor)

Articles and chapters
 "Archaeological Cultures and Past Identities in Precolonial Central Amazon", in Alf Hornborg; Jonathan Hill. (Ed.). Ethnicity in Ancient Amazonia: Reconstructing Past Identities from Archaeology, Linguistics, and Ethnohistory. Boulder: University of Colorado Press, 2010.
 "Warfare in Pre-Colonial Amazonia: When Carneiro Meets Clastres", in Axel Nilsen; William Walker. (Eds.). Warfare in Cultural Context: Practice Theory and the Archaeology of Violence. Tucson: University of Arizona Press, 2009.
 "Ecology, Ceramic Chronology and Distribution, Long-Term History and Political Change in the Amazonian Floodplain" in Helaine Silvermann; William Isbell. (Eds.) Handbook of South American Archaeology. New York: Springer, 2008
 "The Relevance of Curt Nimuendajú's Archaeological Work", in Per Stenbrog; Stig Rydén. (Eds.) In Pursuit of a Past Amazon. Götebrog, Sweden: Museum of World Culture, 2004, v. 45, pp. 2–8. 
 "O Velho e o Novo na Arqueologia Amazônica". Revista USP, Brasil, v. 44, pp. 87–113, 1999.
 "Twenty Years of Amazonian Archaeology in Brazil" in Antiquity , Vol. 72, pp. 625–632, 1998.
 "Village Fissioning in Amazonia: A Critique of Monocausal Determinism", Revista do Museu de Arqueologia e Etnologia, São Paulo, 1995, n. 5.

References

External links 
https://www.researchgate.net/profile/Eduardo_Neves3

Living people
Year of birth missing (living people)
Brazilian archaeologists
University of São Paulo alumni
Academic staff of the University of São Paulo
Indiana University alumni